Operation "Breza 94" was the official codename for the military offensive conducted by the 1st Krajina Corps of the VRS in September 1994 in Bosanska Krajina. The basic prerequisite of the offensive was the breaking of the 5th Corps and the conquest of Bosanska Krajina. The offensive ended in a tactical VRS failure with the ARBiH capturing 20 square kilometers previously held by Serbs.

Background 
The VRS army planned the operation in August and they called for the 2nd Krajina Corps to lead off the offensive with new attacks on the Grabez plateau and that the 1st Krajina Corps would then attack between Buzim and Bosanska Otoka, so the plan was to split the enclave in two. The biggest mistake of the operation was that it started after the Army of the Republic of Bosnia beat the Abdić forces and that the axes it faced were reduced from three to two. The 1st Drvar, 3rd Petrovac, and the 17th Kljuc Light Infantry Brigade, supported by the 15h Bihac Infantry Brigade with about 5,000 to 5,500 troops would attack the Grabez plateau to seize it. The larger part of the operation would be under Mladic's direct supervision and it would be undertaken by the 1st Krajina Brigade. There were two tactical groups in the 1st Krajina brigade, the first tactical group consisted of one battalion from the 5th Kozarska, 6th Sana and 43rd Prijedor Brigades, the mission of the first tactical group was capture and securing the town of Otoka, and further breakthrough towards the Bosanska Krajina. The second tactical group consisted of the Panther Guard, 1st Military Police Battalion and Reconnaissance Squadron of the 1st Krajina Brigade. their task was to capture Bužim and Cazin. The 1st Novigrad Brigade of the VRS and the 33rd Court Brigade of the Serbian Army of Krajina were in charge of providing fire support. On the Bosnian side they relied on the brigades 501st Bihac, 502nd Bihac, 503rd Cazin and the 1st Bosnian Liberation brigade to hold the line around Grabez. Around Buzim and Otoka the corps had the entire 505th Buzim Brigade and most of the 511th Bosanska Krupa Mountain Brigade. All of the 5th Corps mustered about 15.000 troops for the battle. Before the battle Mladić said "Everything here is the best that the Serbian army has and we must enter Bužim in seven days and break the backbone of the 5th Corps, and in 15 days join the Bužim beam with the rest of our forces and occupy the Bihać Pocket".

Battle for Grabez Plateu 
The 2nd Krajina Brigade launched an offensive on the Grabez plateau and the Initial objectives were Alibegovica Kosa and Barakovac Hill. The VRS made some progress but the 5th didn't crack and on the 6 September they launched a counterattack led by the 503rd Cazin Mountain Brigade and they erased VRS gains and even seized some previously Serb-held ground.

Battle for Buzim-Otoka 
The operation was started by the 1st Krajina brigade general Momir Talić and with the supervision of Ratko Mladić.The signalization was the firing of "Orkan" missiles 262 mm with cluster explosives on Bužim and Cazin on the 5th September. The 1st Krajina brigade attacked on a 10-kilometer front towards Otoka and they pushed the 511th Mountain brigade back towards Otoka, crossing the Bastra river on 8–9 September they were only 1-kilometer away from Otoka. The 1st Krajina brigade attacked for 4 days in hope of capturing the city of Otoka, with no success. With the objective of capturing Bužim on the 8 September the Panthers attacked about 10 kilometers north of Otoka, supported by at least a company of tanks. They attacked 2 kilometers into Bosnian territory facing Izet Nanić on 8–9 September. Even with strong artillery support from the RSK on 10–11 September they only managed to capture little territory. On the 12 September the "Panthers" renewed the attack, but the 5th Corps had been planning a major counterattack. The elite units of the 505th Brigade "Hamze" and "Gazije" had been withdrawn from the frontline, while recon-sabotage elements from at least the 502nd Bihac Mountain and 517th Light Brigades were transferred to the area. The ARBIH forces infiltrated neighboring SVK positions and they struck the "Panthers" in the flank. The "Panthers" and the SVK 33rd Dvor Brigade troops withdrew and the Serb attack collapsed.

Aftermath 
ARBiH seized one T-55 tank, three 120 mm mortars, one ZIS cannon, PAT, BST, five TAM-110 motor vehicles, one Puch, an ambulance, "Strela" anti-aircraft missiles, and significant quantities of ammunition of various calibers. the famous VRS tank "siva munja" was destroyed, which fought on all battlefields throughout BiH. Around 100 Bosniak civilians got wounded and around 10 died.

References 

Corps of the Army of the Republic of Bosnia and Herzegovina
Army of Republika Srpska
Bosnian War
Wars of independence
1994 in Bosnia and Herzegovina